Midnight, in comics, may refer to:

 Midnight (DC Comics) a DC Comics character
 Midnight (Jeff Wilde), a Marvel Comics character
 Midnight Sun (Marvel Comics) or Midnight
 Captain Midnight, a radio play character who was adapted into a comic book series by Fawcett Comics
 Doctor Mid-Nite, a DC Comics superhero
 Jessica Midnight, a DC Comics character and member of Checkmate
 Midnight's Fire, a Marvel Comics supervillain
 Midnight Kiss, a 2005 series from Markosia
 Midnight Man (comics), a Marvel Comics character and enemy of Moon Knight
 Midnight, Mass, a comic book series from Vertigo
 Midnight Men, a 1993 mini-series from Epic Comics
 Midnight Mover, a mini-series from Oni Press
 Midnight Nation, a 2000 Top Cow limited series by J. Michael Straczynski
 Midnight Panther, a hentai manga
 Midnight Sons, a Marvel Comics team of supernatural characters
 Midnight Tales, a comic book series from Charlton Comics
 Midnighter, the Wildstorm character and member of The Authority
 Neil Gaiman's Midnight Days, a collection of some of Neil Gaiman's early work at Vertigo
 Nemuri Kayama, also known as Midnight, a character in My Hero Academia
 Sandman Midnight Theatre, a comic book crossover between the two main DC Comics characters named Sandman
 Papa Midnite, a DC and Vertigo Comics character from Hellblazer and an eponymous spin-off miniseries
 Super Midnight, a character from Shang-Chi

See also
Midnight (disambiguation)

References